Elin Johansson (born 28 April 1992) is a Swedish football midfielder. She has played for Sunnanå SK, Piteå IF, and KIF Örebro DFF.

References

External links
 Elin Johansson at KIF Örebro DFF 
  (archive)
 
 

1992 births
Living people
Swedish women's footballers
Damallsvenskan players
Piteå IF (women) players
Women's association football midfielders
Sunnanå SK players
KIF Örebro DFF players